This is a list of butterflies that can be found in the U.S. state of Connecticut. The list is in alphabetical order by scientific name.

Achalarus lyciades – hoary edge
Amblyscirtes hegon – pepper and salt skipper
Amblyscirtes vialis – common roadside skipper
Anatrytone logan – Delaware skipper
Ancyloxypha numitor – least skipper
Anthocharis midea – falcate orangetip
Asterocampa celtis – hackberry emperor
Asterocampa clyton – tawny emperor
Atalopedes campestris – sachem
Atrytonopsis hianna – dusted skipper
Battus philenor – pipevine swallowtail
Boloria bellona – meadow fritillary
Boloria selene – silver-bordered fritillary
Calephelis borealis – northern metalmark
Callophrys augustinus – brown elfin
Calycopis cecrops – red-banded hairstreak
Callophrys gryneus – juniper (olive) hairstreak
Callophrys henrici – Henry's elfin
Callophrys hesseli – Hessel's hairstreak
Callophrys irus – frosted elfin
Callophrys niphon – eastern pine elfin
Callophrys polia – hoary elfin
Carterocephalus palaemon – Arctic skipper
Celastrina ladon – spring azure
Celastrina neglecta – summer azure
Celastrina neglectamajor – Appalachian azure
Cercyonis pegala – common wood nymph
Chlosyne harrisii – Harris' checkerspot
Chlosyne nycteis – silvery checkerspot
Coenonympha tullia – common ringle
Colias eurytheme – orange sulphur
Colias philodice – clouded sulphur
Danaus plexippus – monarch
Enodia anthedon – northern pearly eye
Epargyreus clarus – silver-spotted skipper
Erynnis baptisiae – wild indigo duskywing
Erynnis brizo – sleepy duskywing
Erynnis horatius – Horace's duskywing
Erynnis icelus – dreamy duskywing
Erynnis juvenalis – Juvenal's duskywing
Erynnis lucilius – columbine duskywing
Erynnis martialis – mottled duskywing
Erynnis persius – Persius duskywing
Erynnis zarucco – zarucco duskywing
Euphyes bimacula – two-spotted skipper
Euphyes conspicua – black dash
Euphyes dion – Dion skipper
Euphyes vestris – dun skipper
Eurema lisa – little yellow
Eurema nicippe – sleepy orange
Everes comyntas – eastern tailed blue
Feniseca tarquinius – harvester
Fixsenia favonius – southern hairstreak
Glaucopsyche lygdamus – silvery blue
Hesperia leonardus – Leonard's skipper
Hesperia metea – cobweb skipper
Hesperia sassacus – Indian skipper
Hylephila phyleus – fiery skipper
Junonia coenia – common buckeye
Libytheana carinenta – American snout
Limenitis archippus – viceroy
Limenitis arthemis – red-spotted purple/white admiral
Lycaena epixanthe – bog copper
Lycaena hyllus – bronze copper
Lycaena phlaeas – American copper
Megisto cymela – little wood satyr
Nastra lherminier – swarthy skipper
Nymphalis antiopa – mourning cloak
Nymphalis milberti – Milbert's tortoiseshell
Nymphalis vaualbum – Compton tortoiseshell
Panoquina ocola – ocola skipper
Papilio canadensis – Canadian tiger swallowtail
Papilio cresphontes – giant swallowtail
Papilio glaucus – eastern tiger swallowtail
Papilio polyxenes – black swallowtail
Papilio troilus – spicebush swallowtail
Parrhasius m-album – white M hairstreak
Phoebis sennae – cloudless sulphur
Pholisora catullus – common sootywing
Phyciodes tharos – pearl crescent
Pieris protodice – checkered white
Pieris rapae – cabbage white
Pieris virginiensis – West Virginia white
Poanes hobomok – Hobomok skipper
Poanes massasoit – mulberry wing
Poanes viator – broad-winged skipper
Poanes zabulon – Zabulon skipper
Polites mystic – long dash
Polites origenes – crossline skipper
Polites peckius – Peck's skipper
Polites themistocles – tawny-edged skipper
Polygonia comma – eastern comma
Polygonia interrogationis – question mark
Polygonia progne – gray comma
Pompeius verna – little glassy wing
Pyrgus communis – checkered skipper
Satyrium acadicum – Acadian hairstreak
Satyrium calanus – banded hairstreak
Satyrium caryaevorum – hickory hairstreak
Satyrium edwardsii – Edwards hairstreak
Satyrium liparops – striped hairstreak
Satyrium titus – coral hairstreak
Satyrodes appalachia – Appalachian brown
Satyrodes eurydice – eyed brown
Speyeria aphrodite – Aphrodite fritillary
Speyeria atlantis – Atlantis fritillary
Speyeria cybele – great spangled fritillary
Strymon melinus – gray hairstreak
Thorybes bathyllus – southern cloudywing
Thorybes pylades – northern cloudywing
Thymelicus lineola – European skipper
Urbanus proteus – long-tailed skipper
Vanessa atalanta – red admiral
Vanessa cardui – painted lady
Vanessa virginiensis – American lady
Wallengrenia egeremet – northern broken dash
Zerene cesonia – southern dogface

References

Connecticut
Butterflies